Laura Summer is an American voice actress and producer.

Career
Summer's career began in New York City theater, when she was cast in a production of Antony and Cleopatra, directed by Estelle Parsons. Including voice-over work, she has appeared in over 100 commercials. In the 1980s, she was cast as the trainee for Inspector 12, in the Hanes underwear campaign, known for coining the phrase, "They don't say Hanes until I say they say Hanes".

Her voice acting work includes The Real Ghostbusters as Janine Melnitz, Hello Kitty's Paradise as Mimi, Heather Hogwarsh in Super Pig and the Digimon Adventure series as Patamon. She reprised her Patamon role in the sequel, Digimon Adventure 02. Regarding her role in The Real Ghostbusters, she was interviewed concerning the role, and the interview was included in the DVD set put out by Time/Life, The Real Ghostbusters: Complete Collection. She was replaced on The Real Ghostbusters due to some groups complaining that her characterization was too edgy and sexy for young girls.

Summers again reprised her role as Patamon in Digimon: The Movie in 2000. In 2007, Summers was part of the creative team, along with Jim Vallely and Maggie Row, who created the "Hollywood Father/Daughter Purity Ball", a parity of a purity ball. From 2008 through 2013, Summers had a recurring role on the animated The Garfield Show, where she played the dual roles of twins Druisilla and Minerva.

For the Digimon Adventure tri. movie series, Summers was again called upon to provide the voice of Patamon. She voiced the role in all six films in the series.  For this role, in 2017 Summer was nominated for a Behind the Voice Actors Awards (BTVA) in the Best Female Supporting Vocal Performance in an Anime Movie/Special category. She also reprised her role as Patamon in Digimon Adventure: Last Evolution Kizuna.

Filmography

Voice actress

The Real Ghostbusters as Janine Melnitz, Helen Schreck, Alice Johnson, Catherine, Snrag (Season 1 and 2)
Hello Kitty's Paradise as Mimi
Super Pig as Heather Hogswarsh
Channel Umptee-3 as Additional Voices
Flint the Time Detective as Princess Hightower
Digimon Adventure and Digimon Adventure 02 as Patamon, Tokomon, Poyomon, Sonya, Noriko Kawada
Digimon Rumble Arena as Patamon
Digimon: The Movie as Patamon
The Garfield Show as Druisilla, Minerva, Gloria
Digimon Adventure tri. as Patamon
Twin Star Exorcists as Mayura
Digimon Adventure: Last Evolution Kizuna as Patamon

Actress

New Love, American Style as Comedy Vignettes
Girls Nite Out as Jane
The Facts of Life as Emily
Night Court as Obsessed Fan
Hard to Hold as Fan #1
The Adventure of the Action Hunters as The Wife
She's Out of Control as Receptionist
Nobody's Perfect as Nurse
Problem Child as Additional Voices (Voice)
Beverly Hills Cop III (Voice)
Grace Under Fire as Woman #2
Brotherly Love as Julie
Dare to Love as Additional Voices
Keeping the Faith (Voices)
The Ultimate Christmas Present as (Voices)
The Poof Point as Spaceship Computer (Voices)
Shallow Hal as Additional Voices
The Cheetah Girls as Additional Voices (Uncredited)
Tiger Cruise (Voices)
I Do, They Don't (Voices)
Life Is Ruff as Mom
Pizza My Heart (Voice, Uncredited)
Twitches as Additional Voices (Voice, Uncredited)
Twitches Too (Voice)
Princess (Voice, Uncredited)
Bride Wars (Voice)
Dadnapped (Voice)
Hatching Pete (Voice)
Let It Shine (Voice, Uncredited)
Lovestruck: The Musical (Voice)

Producer
Fight It or Bite It (executive producer - 6 episodes)

References

External links

Living people
Actresses from New York City
American voice actresses
American producers
20th-century American actresses
21st-century American actresses
Year of birth missing (living people)